is a 1963 Japanese television series. It is the 1st NHK taiga drama.

Story

Ten to Chi to deals with the Sengoku period. Based on Funahashi Seiichi's novels "Hana no Shōgai".

The story chronicles the life of Ii Naosuke.

Cast
Onoe Shoroku II as Ii Naosuke
Chikage Awashima as Murayama Taka
Kaoru Yachigusa as Masako no Kata
Keiji Sada as Nagano Shuzen
Nakamura Shikaku II
Kyōko Kagawa as Akiyama Shizu
Shinsuke Ashida as Takemoto
Masakazu Tamura as Tada Tatewaki
Ko Nishimura as Tada Ichiro
Asao Koike as Minegishi Ryunosuke
Isamu Nagato as Kanroku
Masami Shimojō as Miura Hokuan
Kazuo Kitamura as Utsuki Kageyoshi
Akira Kume as Townsend Harris
Koji Ishizaka 
Takeshi Katō as Kaneko Magojiro
Hisano Yamaoka as Kurosawa Tokiko
Yukiji Asaoka as Okichi
Chikao Ohtsuka as Rokuzo
Hiroyuki Nagato as Tsurumatsu
Minoru Uchida as Kurosawa Chizaburo
Jun Tatara as Onoe Kotaro
Tomoko Naraoka as Osei
Masumi Okada as Henry Heusken
Isao Yamagata as Arimura Jizaemon
Kanjūrō Arashi as Tokugawa Nariaki

References

External links

1963 Japanese television series debuts
1963 Japanese television series endings
Taiga drama
1960s drama television series
Jidaigeki television series